Abraham P. Stephens (February 18, 1796 – November 25, 1859) was an American politician who served one term as a U.S. Representative from New York from 1851 to 1853.

Biography
Born near New City, New York, Stephens was educated locally, owned a store near Rockland Lake and served as Postmaster.  During the War of 1812 he was a member of the New York Militia, attaining the rank of Corporal in Captain Theunis Cooper's Company of Colonel Benjamin J. Gurnee's Regiment, which served at Harlem Heights from September to December 1814.

Stephens was active in other businesses, including the Sing Sing and Rockland Lake Ferry Company.  From 1825 to 1828 he was Sheriff of Rockland County.  He was a Justice of the Peace and Chairman of the Rockland County Democratic Party.

Congress 
Stephens was elected as a Democrat to the Thirty-second Congress (March 4, 1851 – March 3, 1853).

Death 
He died in Nyack, New York, November 25, 1859.  He was interred in Oak Hill Cemetery.

Sources

External links

 

1796 births
1859 deaths
American militiamen in the War of 1812
New York (state) postmasters
Sheriffs of Rockland County, New York
Politicians from Rockland County, New York
Democratic Party members of the United States House of Representatives from New York (state)
People from New City, New York
Burials in New York (state)
19th-century American politicians